In some versions of the Māori legend of Tāwhaki, Ngā Atua is the sixth of the twelve layers of the heavens (Craig 1989:183, White 1887–1891, I:App).

References
R. D. Craig, Dictionary of Polynesian Mythology (Greenwood Press: New York, 1989),183; 
J. White, Ancient History of the Maori, 6 vols. (G. Disbury: Wellington, 1887–1891), vol. I, App.

Māori mythology